A singer is a person who sings.

Singer or Singers may refer also to:
 Singer (surname)
 Singer Corporation, major manufacturer of sewing machines
 Singer Building, in which the Singer Corporation was based in New York City
 Singer (dog), a species of wild dog also known as the New Guinea singing dog
 Singer (automobile company), a defunct American maker of luxury cars
 Singer Motors, a defunct British bicycle, motorcycle and automobile manufacturer
 Singer Vehicle Design, a high-end restoration and modification company, founded by Rob Dickinson, and specializing in air-cooled Porsche 911s
 Singer (novel), a 2005 young-adult fantasy novel by Jean Thesman
 Singer railway station, Clydebank, West Dunbartonshire, Scotland
 Singer (naval mine)
 Singers (album), by Mount Eerie
 Singer (band), a Chicago musical group featuring members of Lichens/90 Day Men, U.S. Maple & Town & Country
 Singer (Hunan Television), a Chinese TV series
 Singer (Sri Lanka), Sri Lankan home appliances and consumer electronics retailer and a former subsidiary of Singer Corporation

See also 
 The Singer (disambiguation)
 Singermann